Januarie may refer to:

Ricky Januarie (born 1982), South African rugby player
Januarie, the main character in Chaucer's The Merchant's Tale
The Tale of Januarie, a 2017 opera based on The Merchant's Tale

See also
January (disambiguation)